Civilized Evil is an album by French jazz fusion artist Jean-Luc Ponty that was released in 1980. It was reissued by Atlantic on CD in 1992.

Track listing 
All songs by Jean-Luc Ponty.
"Demagomania" – 6:25
"In Case We Survive" – 4:06
"Forms of Life" – 4:48
"Peace Crusaders" – 5:38
"Happy Robots" – 4:14
"Shape Up Your Mind" – 5:15
"Good Guys, Bad Guys" – 4:41
"Once a Blue Planet" – 4:02

Personnel 
 Jean-Luc Ponty – acoustic & electric violins; keyboards & synth bass (track 3)
 Chris Rhyne – keyboards (tracks 1, 2, 4-8)
 Joaquin Lievano – electric rhythm guitar (tracks 1, 2, 4-7); acoustic guitar (track 8)
 Daryl Stuermer – electric guitar solos (tracks 5 & 7)
 Randy Jackson – electric bass (tracks 1, 2, 4-7)
 Mark Craney – drums (tracks 1, 2, 4-7)

Production
 Gary Starr – engineer
 Karen Siegel – engineer, assistant engineer
 Mark Hanauer – photography
 Bernie Grundman – mastering
 Claudia Ponty – cover art concept

Chart positions

References

External links 
 Jean-Luc Ponty - Civilized Evil (1980) album review by Richard S. Ginell, credits & releases at AllMusic
 Jean-Luc Ponty - Civilized Evil (1980) album releases & credits at Discogs
 Jean-Luc Ponty - Civilized Evil (1980) album credits & user reviews at ProgArchives.com
 Jean-Luc Ponty - Civilized Evil (1980) album to be listened as stream on Spotify

Jean-Luc Ponty albums
1980 albums
Atlantic Records albums